Harecastle Tunnel is a canal tunnel on the Trent and Mersey Canal in Staffordshire between Kidsgrove and Tunstall. Its industrial purpose was for the transport of coal to the kilns in the Staffordshire Potteries. The canal runs under the  Harecastle Hill near Goldenhill, the highest district in Stoke-on-Trent.

Although described singularly as a tunnel, Harecastle is actually two separate but parallel tunnels built almost 50 years apart. The first was constructed by James Brindley in the late 18th century and the second larger tunnel was designed by Thomas Telford, and opened in the late 1820s.

Only the Telford tunnel remains navigable after a partial collapse closed the Brindley tunnel shortly before the First World War. As the Telford tunnel is only wide enough for a single boat, canal traffic is managed by sending alternating northbound and southbound groups of boats through the tunnel. Ventilation is provided by large electric fans at the south portal.

Brindley Tunnel

The first tunnel through Harecastle Hill was designed by canal engineer, James Brindley. Construction began in 1770 when the surveyed route of the tunnel was marked over the hill. Fifteen vertical shafts were then sunk into the ground from which navvies mined outwards from the bottom of the shafts to create the canal line. However, changes in rock type which ranged from soft earth to Millstone Grit caused engineering problems.

The tunnel sites also flooded regularly until Watt steam engines were introduced to operate pumps. Stoves were installed at the bottom of upcast pipes to overcome the problem of ventilation. On opening, it overtook Norwood Tunnel on the Chesterfield Canal (also bored by Brindley) as the longest tunnel on Britain's canal network.

As the tunnel had no towpath, boatsmen had to leg their way through the tunnel. Legging was done by lying on the roof of a boat and using the feet to push forward against the tunnel walls. It was slow hard work. Travel times through the tunnel averaged three hours. While the narrowboats went via the tunnel, boat horses were led over Harecastle Hill via "Boathorse Road".  A lodgekeeper (now Bourne Cottage at ) monitored the movement of the tow-horses, who were often led by boat children, as they crossed the high ground between Kidsgrove and Tunstall.

Within years of the Brindley tunnel opening, its limitation in design soon became evident. The industrial revolution had resulted in rapid growth and increased demand for coal and other raw materials in the Potteries. In the early 19th century, it was decided that a second tunnel should be built by Thomas Telford. Brindley tunnel was used for the rest of the 19th century until it began to suffer an increase in subsidence in the early 20th century. In 1914 it was closed permanently after a partial collapse.

Regular engineering inspections of the disused Brindley tunnel ceased in the 1960s. Since then, no further exploration of the interior has been made beyond any significant distance from the north or south portals. Both entrances are gated and are no longer reachable by boat. Water entering the canal from the Brindley tunnel has been blamed for much of the prominent iron ore leaching into the canal (responsible for the rusty colour of the water). Installation of reed beds at the northern portal to filter the water has been proposed.

Telford Tunnel

Due to the amount of traffic and the slow process of legging, Brindley's Harecastle Tunnel had become a major bottleneck on the Trent and Mersey Canal by the start of the 19th century. By the early 1820s, a commission decided that a second tunnel was required. The esteemed Scottish civil engineer, Thomas Telford, was contracted to carry out the work. Due to advances in civil engineering, the larger tunnel was completed in 1827 after only three years of work, and at a cost of £113,000 (equivalent to £ million in ). As it had a towpath, horses could now pull boats through the  tunnel greatly shortening journey times. It was used in conjunction with the Brindley tunnel, with each tunnel taking boat traffic in opposite directions.

Inside the Telford tunnel are the remains of a series of smaller canal tunnels that connected to coal mines around Goldenhill. As the tunnels led directly to the underground workings of the collieries, coal could be loaded straight into boats avoiding the need for it to be hauled to the surface. The tunnels also helped provide much-needed drainage for the mines. Only small narrowboats with  capacity could use these side tunnels.

Settlement in the tunnel lowered the headroom, and the towpath subsided between the water in places. As a result, an electric tug was introduced in 1914 at a cost of £1,563. It was capable of pulling 30 boats at a time through the tunnel, at a charge of 6d a boat. A second tug was added in 1931. The tug operated until 1954 when system of 3× fans was constructed at the south portal to improve ventilation for diesel-powered craft. While boats are within the tunnel an airtight door is shut so fresh air is constantly drawn through the tunnel. The fans protect boaters from the harmful build-up of diesel fumes. Modern journey times are now about 30–40 minutes.

In the latter part of the 20th century, the Telford tunnel suffered further subsidence resulting in its temporary closure between 1973 and 1977. During this time, the long-disused towpath was removed to increase the width of the tunnel and improve air capacity in the tunnel.

See also

List of canal tunnels in Great Britain
Listed buildings in Kidsgrove

References

Trent and Mersey Canal
Canal tunnels in England
Works of Thomas Telford
Tunnels in Staffordshire
Transport in Staffordshire
Tunnels completed in 1827
Kidsgrove
1827 establishments in England